Metronom Eisenbahngesellschaft mbH is a German non-entirely-state-owned railway company based in Uelzen, Lower Saxony since December 2005. The company's activities focus exclusively on passenger transport, operating services from Hamburg to Bremen, Lüneburg and Uelzen, and from Uelzen to Hannover and Göttingen. Services listed on the timetables are abbreviated ME. Furthermore, the company operates services from Wolfsburg to Hannover and Hildesheim under its other brand Enno.

The company's logo, depicting a swinging pendulum, is often rendered in lower case as metronom (the German word  literally meaning metronome).

History 
At the end of the 1990s, the three participating States of Germany—Lower Saxony, Hamburg and Bremen—agreed to replace Regional-Express services on the routes between Hamburg and Bremen and Hamburg-Uelzen operated by DB Regio with their own railway company.

The company was founded in February 2002 under the name of MetroRail. The ownership structure has remained unchanged and consists of three companies that represent the individual states and were based almost exclusively in the public domain. Specifically, these are the NiedersachsenBahn GmbH (69.9%), the BeNEX GmbH (25.1%) and the Bremer Straßenbahn AG (5.0%). The NiedersachsenBahn GmbH acts as an operating company and is a union of the railways Osthannoversche Eisenbahnen (OHE) (60%), based in Celle and the railways and transport companies Elbe-Weser GmbH (Eisenbahnen und Verkehrsbetriebe Elbe-Weser) (40%) of Zeven.

In autumn 2003, the company was renamed after a dispute with Metro AG and their current name and the logo were adopted. For 14 December 2003 the operation was established on the lines Hamburg-Bremen and Hamburg-Uelzen.

In April 2007, the majority of the OHE was sold, by the state of Lower Saxony, Germany and the DB Regio AG, after a bidding process to the British transport company Arriva Bachstein GmbH, in which the Arriva Germany GmbH is involved with 86%. As a result, Arriva indirectly controls 30.7% of the capital of the Metronom Eisenbahngesellschaft and so is its largest shareholder.

Metronom doesn't own vehicles or maintenance resources. All locomotives and railway carriages are rented by the state transport company Landesnahverkehrsgesellschaft Niedersachsen mbH (LNVG) and are maintained in the depot of OHE Uelzen by personnel of the manufacturer Bombardier Inc. and the OHE. This depot was built specifically for the maintenance of the metronom trains and is located in the north of Uelzen, in the so-called Dannenberger Bogen. The maintenance of the trains by the Eisenbahnen und Verkehrsbetriebe Elbe-Weser for the Lower Elbe Railway takes place in Bremervörde, for this the trains are transferred partly through the route of the former Buxtehude Harsefelder Eisenbahn and partly through the section of the Stade-Bremervörde Moor Express, at the latter three complete units coupled together.

With the monitoring and disposal of its trains, the railway company metronom has also mandated the OHE. From Celle the OHE staff controls around the clock the entire company operations and initiates appropriate measures to stop irregularities (e.g. delays, road closures, personnel failures, vehicle interference).

Operations

The company operates the following services.

Fleet

Names of Metronom locomotives 
 ME 146-01 (146 501) – Scheeßel + 60 Jahre Niedersachsen
 ME 146-02 (146 502) – Lüneburg
 ME 146-03 (146 503) – Bienenbüttel
 ME 146-04 (146 504) – Buchholz in der Nordheide
 ME 146-05 (146 505) – Rotenburg (Wümme)
 ME 146-06 (146 506) – Winsen (Luhe)
 ME 146-07 (146 507) – Lauenbrück
 ME 146-08 (146 508) – Uelzen
 ME 146-09 (146 509) – Tostedt
 ME 146-10 (146 510) – Bad Bevensen
 ME 146-11 (146 511) – Einbeck
 ME 146-12 (146 512) – Burgdorf
 ME 146-13 (146 513) – Alfeld (Leine)
 ME 146-14 (146 514) – Sarstedt
 ME 146-15 (146 515) – Elze
 ME 146-16 (146 516) – Celle
 ME 146-17 (146 517) – Langenhagen
 ME 146-18 (146 518) – Großburgwedel + 60 Jahre Niedersachsen
 91 80 6146 531-9 D-ME (146 531) - Seevetal-Maschen
 91 80 6146 532-7 D-ME (146 532) - Seevetal-Meckelfeld
 91 80 6146 533-5 D-ME (146 533) - Bardowick
 91 80 6146 534-3 D-ME (146 534) - Seevetal-Hittfeld
 91 80 6146 537-7 D-ME (146 537) - Stelle
 92 80 1246 002-0 D-BTK (246 002-0) - Buxtehude
 92 80 1246 003-8 D-BTK (246 003-8) - Cuxhaven
 92 80 1246 004-6 D-BTK (246 004-6) - Stade
 92 80 1246 005-3 D-BTK (246 005-3) - Horneburg
 92 80 1246 006-1 D-BTK (246 006-1) - Otterndorf
 92 80 1246 007-9 D-BTK (246 007-9) - Himmelpforten

References

External links 
 Official web site
 Fan site 
 Pictures of rolling stock 
 360° Virtual Reality View of Metronom Car

Railway companies of Germany
Private railway companies of Germany